Gregory Ignatius Zhatkovich (December 2, 1886 – March 26, 1967) was an American lawyer and political activist for Rusyns in the United States and Europe.

He was the first governor of Carpathian Ruthenia, the Rusyn autonomous province of Czechoslovakia and the only American who was a governor of any territory that was or became part of the Soviet Union.

Early life and career

He was born in the village of Galambos, Bereg County, Austria-Hungary (now Holubyne, Svaliava Raion, Zakarpattia Oblast, Ukraine) and emigrated to Pennsylvania with his parents at age five.

His father, Paul Zhatkovich, was the founding editor of the leading Rusyn-American newspaper, Amerikansky Russky Viestnik.

Zhatkovich graduated from high school in Pittsburgh, earned his undergraduate degree from the University of Pennsylvania in 1907, and his LL.D. from the law school at Penn in 1910.

Involvement in Rusyn Affairs 1918-1921

Following his father's involvement in Rusyn affairs, Zhatkovich was drawn in 1918 into the role of a spokesman for the American National Council of Uhro-Rusyns, at the time when the dissolution of Austria-Hungary placed their future - as that of many other peoples - on the international diplomatic agenda.

In July 1918, Rusyn-Americans convened and called for complete independence of Carpathian Ruthenia. Failing that, they would try to unite with Galicia and Bukovina; and failing that, they would demand autonomy, though they did not specify under which state.

Members of President Woodrow Wilson's administration told  Zatkovich and other Rusyn-Americans that "the only viable option was unification with the new state of Czechoslovakia".  Zatkovich accepted that the best he could do was work for creating a place for Rusyns in Czechoslovakia, and signed the "Philadelphia Agreement" with Czechoslovak President Tomáš Masaryk, guaranteeing Rusyn autonomy upon unification with Czechoslovakia.

A referendum was held among American Rusyn parishes, with a resulting 67% in favor. In May 1919, a Central National Council convened under Zatkovich and voted unanimously to accept the Czechoslovak solution. An assembly held in the territory itself on May 8, 1919 "Endorsed the decision of the American Uhro-Rusin Council to unite with the Czech-Slovak nation on the basis of full national autonomy."

Zatkovich was appointed governor of the province by Masaryk on April 20, 1920. He resigned, however, less than a year later, on April 17, 1921, to return to his law practice in Pittsburgh, Pennsylvania, USA.  

The declared reasons for his resignation were the unkept promises, dissatisfaction with the untruthful borders inside Czechoslovakia, but primarily the fact Tomáš Garrigue Masaryk did not want to grant autonomy to Carpathian Ruthenia.

As noted, his tenure is a historical anomaly as the only American citizen ever acting as governor of a province that later became a part of the USSR.

Death
Zhatkovich died in Pittsburgh in 1967, aged 80,  and was  interred there at Calvary Cemetery.

Publications

In fiction

The third part of the novel "A Carpathian Rhapsody", by the 
Hungarian left-wing writer Béla Illés - whose plot takes place in Carpathian Ruthenia between the end of the 19th century and the aftermath of World War I - is called "Gregory Zhatkovich's Kingdom". 
The highly partisan book presents Zhatkovich in a negative way, claiming that he was the dupe of American and French business and military interests, and that he had little control of or interest in the territory placed under his charge.

The book also asserts that the imperial interests which placed Zhatkovich in charge were mainly interested in using the territory as a conduit for arms and ammunition to the anti-Soviet Polish forces fighting the Polish-Soviet War of 1920, than going on directly to the north, and that Zhatkovich had to resign after failing to stop local Communists from holding strikes as well as repeatedly sabotaging the railway line from Prague, through which the munitions were passing.

See also

 Carpathian Ruthenia

References

External links
 Carpatho-rusyn.org — Zhatkovich biography
 "Ruthenia - Spearhead Toward the West", by Senator Charles J. Hokky, Former Member of the Czechoslovakian Parliament (Book includes numerous references to and quotations from Zatkovich, interpreted from a Hungarian nationalist point of view)

1886 births
1967 deaths
Austro-Hungarian emigrants to the United States
People from Zakarpattia Oblast
People from the Kingdom of Hungary
People from Carpathian Ruthenia
Burials at Calvary Catholic Cemetery (Pittsburgh)
Lawyers from Pittsburgh
American people of Rusyn descent
University of Pennsylvania Law School alumni
20th-century American lawyers